Lofthouse is a small village in Nidderdale in the Harrogate district of North Yorkshire, England about a mile south of Middlesmoor. It is the principal settlement in the civil parish of Fountains Earth. Lofthouse has a primary school, memorial village hall and public house, the Crown Hotel. The post office in the village closed in August 2014, and was replaced by a post office in the cafe at nearby How Stean Gorge, also now closed.

The toponym is from the Old Norse lopt hús, meaning "houses with lofts".

The Nidderdale Caves lie just north of the village. The River Nidd runs underground through the caves and emerges at Nidd Heads, just south of the village. The normally dry surface bed of the river passes the village to the west.

Between 1907 and 1929 Lofthouse had a railway station, the public passenger terminus of the Nidd Valley Light Railway. The station was named Lofthouse-in-Nidderdale railway station to avoid confusion with Lofthouse and Outwood railway station, also in the West Riding of Yorkshire.

References

External links

Villages in North Yorkshire
Nidderdale